Coex is a biopolymer with flame-retardant properties derived from the functionalization of cellulosic fibers such as cotton, linen, jute, cannabis, coconut, ramie, bamboo, raffia palm, stipa, abacà, sisal, nettle and kapok. The treatment effectiveness was also proven on wood and semi-synthetic fibers such as cellulose acetate, cellulose triacetate, viscose, modal, lyocell and cupro.

The material is obtained by sulfation and phosphorylation reactions on glucan units linked to each other in position 1,4 and in particular on the secondary and tertiary hydroxyl groups of cellulosic biopolymer. The chemical modification of the fibers does not involve physical and visual alterations compared to the starting material.

in 2015 the World Textile Information Network (WTiN) declared Coex the winner of the "Future material award" as best innovation for the Home Textile category.

Properties
Coex preserves the physical and chemical characteristics of the raw material to which is applied. The main features of Coex materials are comfort, hydrophilicity, antistatic properties, mechanical resistance and a great versatility in the textile sector, like all natural and semi-synthetic cellulosic fibers.

This materials are resistant to moths, mildew and sunlight. The main feature of biopolymers Coex is the flame resistance, they work with fireproof action, creating a barrier to the flames and not simply delaying the fire. Through molecular modification fibres carbonize and therefore extinguish the flame. The resulting products are hypoallergenic and biodegradable.

References

External links
Official Website
Super Absorbent Polymer
https://www.thomasnet.com/articles/plastics-rubber/plastic-coextrusion/

Organic polymers
Biomaterials
Brand name materials